Mark Fredrick Farner (born September 29, 1948) is an American musician and songwriter who was the original lead singer and guitarist of the hard rock band Grand Funk Railroad, which he founded alongside his bandmates in 1969, and remained a power trio for most of its successful years, and later a contemporary Christian artist.

Early life and career 
Farner began his career by playing in Terry Knight and the Pack (1965–1966), the Bossmen (1966–1967), the Pack (aka The Fabulous Pack) (1967–1968), before forming Grand Funk Railroad with Don Brewer (drums) and Mel Schacher (bass) in 1969. Craig Frost (keyboards) joined the band in 1972. Farner has Cherokee ancestry from his maternal side.

With Grand Funk Railroad 

Farner was the founder, guitarist and original lead singer for Grand Funk Railroad as well as the principal songwriter for most of their material. His best-known composition as a singer is the 1970 song "I'm Your Captain (Closer to Home)". He also wrote the 1975 hit "Bad Time", the last of the band's four singles to make the top 5 on the US Billboard Hot 100.

Post-Grand Funk Railroad 
After Grand Funk initially disbanded in 1976, Farner released his self-titled debut solo album in 1977, and his second, No Frills, in 1978 (both Atlantic Records). In 1981, Farner and Don Brewer launched a new Grand Funk line-up with bassist Dennis Bellinger and recorded two albums, Grand Funk Lives and What's Funk? Farner went solo again with 1988's Just Another Injustice by Frontline Records. His third Frontline release was 1991's Some Kind of Wonderful, which featured a revamped Jesus version of the Grand Funk classic of the same name. Farner became a born again Christian in the late 1980s and enjoyed success with the John Beland composition "Isn't it Amazing", which earned him a Dove Award nomination and reached No. 2 on the Contemporary Christian music charts.

In the 1990s, Farner formed Lismark Communications with former Freedom Reader editor Steve Lisuk. Soon after, Farner began reissuing his solo albums on his own record label, LisMark Records.

From 1994 to 1995, Farner toured with Ringo Starr's Allstars, which also featured Randy Bachman, John Entwistle, Felix Cavaliere, Billy Preston, and Starr's son, Zak Starkey.

In the late 1990s, Farner reunited with Grand Funk, but left after three years to resume his solo career. He currently tours with his band, Mark Farner's American Band, which plays a mixture of Grand Funk songs and Farner's solo offerings.

Farner had a pacemaker installed October 22, 2012, having struggled with heart troubles for the previous eight years.

Mark Farner was voted into the Michigan Rock and Roll Legends Hall of Fame as a solo artist in 2015. He had previously been inducted as a member of both Grand Funk Railroad and Terry Knight & The Pack.

Other interests 
Farner was honored with the Lakota Sioux Elders Honor Mark in 1999. During the concert in Hankinson, North Dakota, a special presentation was held honoring Mark's Native ancestry and his contributions. Members of the Lakota Nation presented him with a hand-made ceremonial quilt. He has also been honored with the Cherokee Medal of Honor by the Cherokee Honor Society.<ref name=

An authorized biography of Farner, entitled From Grand Funk to Grace, was published in 2001.

In popular culture 

Mark Farner is mentioned by Homer Simpson in The Simpsons episode, "Homerpalooza", in season 7, episode 24 of the series. As Homer drives his children and their friends to school, Grand Funk is on the car radio. The children do not like it and ask him to change the station when he responds, "you kids don't know Grand Funk? The wild, shirtless lyrics of Mark Farner. The bong-rattling drumwork of Don Brewer. The competent bass work of Mel Schacher?"

Mark Farner was mentioned in episode 9 of season 8 of the HBO comedy series Curb Your Enthusiasm in September 2011.

Discography

Studio albums 
 Mark Farner, 1977
 No Frills, 1978
 Just Another Injustice, 1988
 Wake Up..., 1989
 Some Kind of Wonderful, 1991
 For the People, 2006

with Grand Funk Railroad 

On Time (1969)
Grand Funk (1969)
Closer to Home (1970)
Live Album (1970)
Survival (1971)
E Pluribus Funk (1971)
Phoenix (1972)
We're an American Band (1973)
Shinin' On (1974)
All the Girls in the World Beware!!! (1974)
Caught in the Act (1975)
Born to Die (1976)
Good Singin', Good Playin' (1976)
Grand Funk Lives (1981)
What's Funk? (1983)
Bosnia (1996)

Other releases 
 Closer to Home, 1992 (best-of)
 Heirlooms: The Complete Atlantic Sessions, 2000 (re-release of Farner's two first studio albums)
 Red White and Blue Forever, 2002 (mini-album)
 Live!! N'rG, 2003
 Mark Farner the Rock Patriot, March 9, 2003, Live Extended Versions

References

External links 

 
 2008 Mark Farner interview

1948 births
Living people
American baritones
American people of Cherokee descent
American performers of Christian music
American rock guitarists
American male guitarists
American rock singers
American male singer-songwriters
American rock songwriters
Grand Funk Railroad members
Lead guitarists
Musicians from Flint, Michigan
Singer-songwriters from Michigan
Guitarists from Michigan
20th-century American guitarists
Terry Knight and the Pack members
20th-century American male musicians
Ringo Starr & His All-Starr Band members